Forézien may refer to:

the people of Forez
a dialect of the Franco-Provençal language